"Cold Outside" is a debut song recorded by American country music group Big House.  It was released in February 1997 as the first single from the album Big House.  The song reached #30 on the Billboard Hot Country Singles & Tracks chart.  The song was written by Monty Byrom, David Neuhauser, Dennis Knutson and Max Reese.

Chart performance

References

1997 debut singles
1997 songs
Big House (band) songs
MCA Nashville Records singles
Songs written by Dennis Knutson
Songs written by Monty Byrom